Everet v Williams [1725] (also known as the "Highwayman's Case") is an English court case dating back to 1725, regarding the enforceability of contracts to commit crimes. In this case, the contract was to share the spoils of armed robbery, which the court refused to uphold.

There are no contemporaneous reports of the case surviving, and most references to it relate to a summary of the case found in the 1893 Law Quarterly Review, which in turn relies upon a text from 1802, an English translation of a French work on the law of obligations by Robert Joseph Pothier.

Facts
Everet and Williams were both highwaymen, and entered into a partnership to split the proceeds from their robberies.  For some time, the two engaged in this pursuit on Hounslow Heath, as well as at Bagshot, Salisbury, Hampstead, and elsewhere.  When the proceeds of these activities were sold, John Everet believed that Joseph Williams had maneuvered himself into receiving more than his fair share of the profits.  For some unknown reason, Everet decided to take his grievance to the courts for settlement.  He hired attorneys and counsel to sue Williams in court for the balance he thought due, pleading "for discovery, an account, and general relief" for the "profits" made under their "partnership".

The plaintiff’s pleadings referred to the nature of the partnership that it was "skilled in dealing in several sorts of commodities" and that they "proceeded jointly in the said dealings with good success on Hounslow Heath, where they dealt with a gentleman for a gold watch", adding that Hounslow Heath "was a good and convenient place to deal in, and that the said commodities were very plenty at Finchley aforesaid".

The pleadings went on to state that the parties had "dealt with several gentlemen for divers watches, rings, swords, canes, hats, cloaks, horses, bridles, saddles, and other things to the value of £200 and upwards", and that these goods were obtained for "little or no money….after some small discourse with the said gentleman", adding that "the said things were dealt for 'at a very cheap rate.'"

Judgment
On 30 October 1725 lawyers acting on behalf of John Everet presented a Bill in Equity at the Court of Exchequer, setting out the details of his claim.  Less than two weeks later, on 13 November 1725, the Court of Exchequer was less than impressed with the idea of being asked to settle a dispute amongst highwaymen regarding the division of the spoils and considered the Bill "both scandalous and impertinent".  Not only was the case dismissed, but a warrant was issued for the arrest of the two solicitors who brought the suit forth.  Subsequently, both solicitors, William White and William Wreathock, were arrested and brought before the court and, on 6 December, both were fined £50 each.  Also on 6 December, the barrister who signed the original bill bringing the suit to court, Jonathan Collins, was ordered to pay all court costs.

Significance
Worse was in store for both Everet and Williams. Williams, the defendant, was arrested and executed by hanging in 1727 in Maidstone, while Everet, the plaintiff, was hanged 3 years later in Tyburn.  Finally, one of the solicitors involved in the action, Wreathock, was convicted of robbery in 1735 and sentenced to hang, but his sentence was commuted to transportation; he obtained a royal pardon, returned in England and resumed his practice until 1758, when he was struck off.

The general principle is still accepted throughout the western system as law, and despite the insufficient nature of the report, it is still regularly cited for its central proposition.  In 2013 the case was cited in the UBS case which was brought before the Seventh Circuit Court of Appeals in the United States.  Lord Sumption cited it in his judgment in his 2015 Supreme Court decision in Jetivia SA v Bilta (UK) Limited (in liquidation) and again in 2016 in his decision in Patel v Mirza.

See also
Ex turpi causa
English contract law

References

English contract case law
1725 in British law
Court of Exchequer Chamber cases